Alberto Valdiri (August 14, 1959 – December 20, 2014) was a Colombian actor.

Valdiri was born in Bogotá, Colombia. His credits include comedic and dramatics roles in television series, telenovelas, theater, and more than twenty films. He appeared as Gordito González on Yo soy Betty, la fea and Francisco Mujica in the 2008 telenovela, Doña Bárbara.

Valdiri died from a heart attack in Bogotá, Colombia, on December 20, 2014, at the age of 55. He was buried in Cementerio Distrital Norte in Bogota.

References

External links

1959 births
2014 deaths
Colombian male television actors
Colombian male telenovela actors
Colombian male film actors
Colombian male stage actors